The TRF1 is a 155mm French towed howitzer produced by Nexter (ex Giat Industries) and used by the French Army.

The TRF1 was showcased in 1979 at the Eurosatory arms trade show, as a replacement for Armée de Terre's BF-50. Giat produced it from 1984 to 1993.

Performance
Setting out of battery: 2 min
Crossing of slopes of 60%, fords of 1.20m.
Horizontal field of fire: 445mil to the left, 675mil to the right.
Hydraulic aiming

Ammunition
Capacity of tractor: 56 rounds, 32 on pallets and 24 in racks.
Can fire all 155 mm ammunition (the normal ammunition is the high-explosive shell).
Casings are combustible, which improves rate of fire: there is nothing to extract before reloading.

Operators

Current operators
  - 12 delivered in 1991
  - 28 delivered in 1990-1991
  - 8 delivered in 2011
  - ex-French Army guns bought in September 2022

Former operators 
  - 105 or 106 delivered, last retired in April 2022

See also
Soltam M-71
G5 howitzer

References

Post–Cold War artillery of France
Nexter Systems
Howitzers
155 mm artillery
Military equipment introduced in the 1990s